Jianying Zha or Zha Jianying (born 1959) is a Chinese American journalist and non-fiction writer. She writes and publishes in both English and Chinese.

Born in Beijing, Jianying Zha was educated in the United States. She is a contributor to The New Yorker.

Works
 Dao Meiguo qu, dao meiguo qu [Going to America, Going to America]. Bei jing: Zuo jia chu ban she, 1991.
 China pop: how soap operas, tabloids, and bestsellers are transforming a culture. New York: New Press, 1995.
 Liu Mei gu shi = Liumei Gushi. Shijiazhuang Shi: Hua shan wen yi chu ban she, 2003.
 Ba shi nian dai fang tan lu. Hong Kong: Oxford University Press, 2006.
 Tide players: the movers and shakers of a rising China. New York: New Press, 2011.

References

1959 births
Living people
Chinese women journalists
Chinese non-fiction writers
Chinese emigrants to the United States
Writers from Beijing